Krewe of Tucks is a New Orleans Mardi Gras krewe.

History and formation
Tucks began in 1969 as a group of Loyola University students applied for a parade permit. The club takes its name from Friar Tuck's, an Uptown New Orleans local gathering hole and pub, where two college students decided to create their own Carnival krewe after unsuccessfully trying to become white flambeaux carriers.  The parade has grown from a small nighttime parade of pick-up trucks and boats pulled on trailers, into a procession of major proportions. In 1983 the parade became a daytime event and in 1986 the parade route finally stretched to downtown. Past Grand Marshals include a person sporting a Bart Simpson costume, film-maker Spike Lee and members of the New Orleans Saints. Past Kings include John Candy and Eugene Levy. Notable riders have included The Blues Brothers, WWF Wrestlers, MTV's: The Real World New Orleans Cast and Rob Dyrdek, from MTV's fantasy factory.

Membership
Krewe of Tucks admits both men and women stating the only requirement for membership is a desire to put on a magnificent show for the crowds. Even though the club has grown in size and stature with 1800+ riders, Tucks has not lost its sense of humor and maintains an "Animal House" reputation.

Parade
The Krewe of Tucks parades during New Orleans Mardi Gras, on the Saturday before Mardi Gras. The parade begins on Napoleon Avenue parading down St. Charles Avenue and ends on Canal Street where the post-parade blowout, the Tucks Extravaganza, kicks into high gear.

Parade themes
Krewe of Tucks parade themes are known for irreverence and satire. Floats, including the King's Throne, a giant toilet, as well as the Queen of Tucks, surrounded by her maids dressed in "French Maid" fashion.

Iconic floats
Ye Olde Outhouse
Ye Royal Bath is the only float in Mardi Gras with a giant functioning slide into a giant hot-tub
The Funky Tucks is a 3-Float tandem which boasts cages flocking each corner of the float with Cage Dancers inside.
The Tucksedeauxs is an art deco float designed as a giant champagne bottle pouring bubbles into a Krewe of Tucks goblet with dancing ladies.

Throws
Trinkets, collectables, masks, and beads tossed by hand from riders of the floats are called throws. Collectible throws include the Tucks emblem beads, stuffed animals, signature beads, light-up medallion beads, custom print go-cups, three different types of doubloons, stuffed toilet paper doll, toilet sunglasses, and hand decorated toilet bowl brushes.

Leading up to parade day Krewe of Tucks hosts several events, fundraisers, and community service projects throughout the city for members to attend. Most notably, the Tucks has partnered with Magnolia Community Services, an organization and school dedicated to helping special needs students work with Tucks in designing Signature Throw Items. In 2017, the students from Magnolia created over 10,000 hand decorated Plungers which went into the hands of all Mardi Gras Revilers on parade day.

Tucks Extravaganza
Tucks Extravaganza is a post-parade party inside the Marriott Grand Ball Room on Canal street that includes live music, food, drink, and dancing. It is open to the public by paid admission and attire is costumed (preferred) or casual.

Tucks Coronation
Tucks Coronation Ball is a Carnival ball to crown the new king and queen for the upcoming parade. The court is composed of maids from each float, who costume as French Maids. This ball has taken place at several downtown hotels over the years, such as the Marriott, Sheraton and Hyatt Regency, and includes live music, food, drink, and dancing. Some unique features of the Coronation Ball include Al ‘Carnival Time’ Johnson singing several of his hits with the live band and having a high school marching band leading the Coronation parade, which includes hand-pulled floats, around the ballroom.

Depictions in media
The Krewe of Tucks Parade was depicted in "Confused & Abused", the fifth episode of the MTV reality television series The Real World: New Orleans, which aired in 2010. In the episode, the cast rode a float in the Tucks Parade.

Other
In 2018 the Krewe of Tucks celebrated its 50th anniversary. Included in the celebration was the creation of 4 new floats as well as an animated TUCKS 50th anniversary signature float.

References 

Mardi Gras in New Orleans